is a passenger railway station in the city of Futtsu, Chiba Prefecture, Japan, operated by the East Japan Railway Company (JR East).

Lines
Sanukimachi Station is served by the Uchibo Line, and is located 50.7 km from the starting point of the line at Soga Station.

Layout
The station consists of a single island platform serving two tracks, connected to the station building by a footbridge. The station is staffed.

Platforms

History
Sanukimachi Station was opened on January 15, 1915. The station was absorbed into the JR East network upon the privatization of the Japan National Railways (JNR) on April 1, 1987.

Passenger statistics
In fiscal 2019, the station was used by an average of 211 passengers daily (boarding passengers only).

Surrounding area
 
 
Sanuki Middle School

See also
 List of railway stations in Japan

References

External links

 JR East Station information  

Railway stations in Japan opened in 1915
Railway stations in Chiba Prefecture
Uchibō Line
Futtsu